Bloody Reunion (aka To Sir, with Love, My Teacher or Teacher's Mercy) is a 2006 South Korean horror film, and the feature film debut of director Im Dae-Woong.

Plot 
Detective Ma investigates a mass murder at the residence of Ms. Park. Five were killed with two survivors: Ms. Park and her caretaker, Mi-Ja. Mi-Ja recounts her story to Ma.

Mi-Ja takes care of her ex-teacher, Ms. Park. They organize a class reunion with Ms. Park's past students: Se-Ho, Eun-Young, Dal-Bong, Sun-Hee, Myung-Ho, and Jung-Won. Each resent Ms. Park for different reasons: the couple Se-Ho and Eun-Young because of Ms. Park's belittling of their poverty; Dal-Bong because of his cast leg caused by Ms. Park punishing him with repeated squatting after losing a relay at track; Sun-Hee because of Ms. Park's criticizing of her former obesity; and Myung-Ho because of Ms. Park sexually abusing him. The friendless and quiet Jung-Won, once ridiculed for defecating in class, stopped attending school when his mother was hit by a car. Nevertheless, they all try to maintain a facade of jolliness for the reunion.

However, tensions arise as the former classmates become more open about their anger. Se-Ho drunkenly explodes during the barbecue party and accuses the others of lying to themselves. A bunny-masked figure later drags him to the basement, where he is killed. Eun-Young tries to drown Ms. Park while the latter is bathing, though it fails. She is attacked next by the bunny figure and killed. Dal-Bong tries to attack Ms. Park but is caught by the bunny figure, who inserts insects into his ear to kill him. Throughout the murders, flashbacks show the students laughing at Ms. Park's deformed son, who wore a bunny mask to hide his face. Only Jung-Won wanted to befriend him, but Ms. Park mistakenly assumed him the bully. Sun-Hee tries to throw Ms. Park off the cliff, but is interrupted by Mi-Ja. In the ensuing struggle, Sun-Hee falls off instead and dies. Mi-Ja is knocked out by Myung-Ho, who would have set Ms. Park on fire if not for the bunny figure killing him. The figure is revealed to be Jung-Won.

Detective Ma investigates Jung-Won's supposed apartment. All he finds is his mother's decaying corpse, women's clothing, and articles about the success of Ms. Park's ex-students, contrary to Mi-Ja's claims. It is revealed that there is no male student of Ms. Park's bearing the name "Jung-Won"; it is instead the real name of Mi-Ja. She fabricated the story about her life: she was the one who was poor, obese, broke her leg after doing Ms. Park's punishment, and defecated in the class. Her mother was handicapped during the car accident and died when she was an adult. Jung-Won then took the identity of Mi-Ja and became Ms. Park's caretaker until she could kill her classmates at the reunion.

Jung-Won drives Ms. Park to the beach and vents her frustration at her before committing suicide by jumping from the pier, while Ms. Park can only watch. The film closes with Ms. Park's wheelchair lying empty on the pier.

Cast 
 Oh Mi-hee as Ms. Park, the old teacher dying of an illness and is resented by the other characters. In her eyes she thought she was doing what was best for them.
 Seo Young-hee as Mi-Ja/Jung-Won, the only student who doesn't resent Ms. Park and works as her caretaker. Mi-Ja and Ms. Park share a special bond.
 Lee Ji-Hyun as Sun-Hee, was once obese and teased by Ms. Park but then became skinny and obsessed with her appearance and weight. She has to wear sunglasses to hide the stitches from a recent eye surgery.
 Lee Dong-kyu as Myung-Ho, a boy who was always favoured by Mrs Park. It is hinted that she made sexual contact with him that has left him scarred for life.
 Yu Seol-ah as Eun-Young, the class vice president whose family was to be poor. For a present, she made her a card that said "I love you Ms. Park". Ms. Park then ridiculed her in front of the entire class.
 Park Hyo-jun as Dal-Bong, used to be the most athletic boy in school. After he came last in a relay, Ms. Park slapped him and made him spend a day doing squats, which later caused him to permanently injure his knee when playing soccer the next day.
 Yeo Hyun-soo as Se-Ho, the former class president who was close to Eun-Young. Ms. Park bullied him for being poor. He is the first to tell Ms. Park how he feels in a drunken rage.
 Jang Seong-won as "Jung-Won", the shy boy that no one used to talk to. He apparently "pooped his pants" during lesson once and the entire class laughed at him including Ms. Park. His mother was then severely injured in a car accident and he dropped out of school, only to reappear at the reunion years later.
 Kim Eung-soo as Detective Ma, trying to figure out the case of the murders.
 Lee Ji-hyun as Sun-hee

References

External links 
 
 
 
 Review at Koreanfilm.org

2006 films
2006 horror films
South Korean horror films
Films about educators
Films about disability
Films about mass murder
2000s Korean-language films
South Korean films about revenge
South Korean slasher films
2006 directorial debut films
2000s South Korean films